Long to Be Loose is an album by jazz guitarist Wayne Krantz. It was the first album with Lincoln Goines on bass guitar and Zach Danziger at drums.

Track listing
"These Instrumental Pieces Were" – 2:01
"Not Consciously Written About" – 6:47
"Specific People, Places, Things Or Ideas" – 6:38
"(Although One Began" – 7:01
"From A Little Croaking Sound" – 5:03
"A Friend's DAT Machine Makes)" – 6:35
"What They Were Written About" – 6:27
"Is Something I Don't Understand Yet" – 6:14
"But I Know It When I See It" – 6:37
"And Hopefully So Will You" – 7:41

Personnel
 Wayne Krantz – guitar
 Lincoln Goines – bass guitar
 Zach Danziger – drums

External links
[ Long To Be Loose Overview] – from Allmusic
Long To Be Loose – from Enja Records

1993 albums
Enja Records albums
Wayne Krantz albums